The 2017 Stockton Challenger was a professional tennis tournament played on outdoor hard courts. It was the third edition of the tournament and was part of the 2017 ITF Women's Circuit. It took place in Stockton, United States, on 17–23 July 2017.

Singles main draw entrants

Seeds 

 1 Rankings as of 3 July 2017.

Other entrants 
The following players received a wildcard into the singles main draw:
  Ashley Kratzer
  Ashley Lahey
  Lauren Marker
  Anna Tatishvili

The following player received entry by a protected ranking:
  Kimiko Date
  Xu Shilin

The following players received entry from the qualifying draw:
  Victoria Duval
  Michaela Gordon
  Ingrid Neel
  Allie Will

Champions

Singles

 Sofia Kenin def.  Ashley Kratzer, 6–0, 6–1

Doubles
 
 Usue Maitane Arconada /  Sofia Kenin def.  Tammi Patterson /  Chanel Simmonds, 4–6, 6–1, [10–5]

External links 
 2017 Stockton Challenger at ITFtennis.com
 Official website

2017 ITF Women's Circuit
2017 in American tennis
Tennis tournaments in the United States
2017 in sports in California
Sports competitions in Stockton, California